Babbage is the high level assembly language for the GEC 4000 series minicomputers. It was named after Charles Babbage, an English computing pioneer.

Example 
PROCESS CHAPTER FACTORIAL

ENTRY LABEL ENTRYPOINT

LITERAL TO = 4                              // Assume using the default proforma

EXTERNAL ROUTINE
     OPEN,
     PUT,
     CLOSE,
     TOCHAR

VECTOR [0,19] OF BYTE ANSWER = "factorial x = xxxxxx"
 
HALF COUNT
HALF VALUE
FULL RESULT

//******************************************************************************

     ROUTINE FACT(VALUE)
     // return factorial of RA.

     VALUE => RESULT

     WHILE DECREMENT VALUE GT //0// DO
     <<
          RESULT * VALUE => RESULT
     >>
     RETURN(RESULT)
     END

//******************************************************************************

ENTRYPOINT:

     OPEN(TO, 1)

     // Print factorials for numbers 1 through 9
     1 => RA
     REPEAT
     <<
          RA => COUNT
          FACT(RA) => RA
          TOCHAR(RA, 7, ANSWER + 13)
          TOCHAR(COUNT, 2, ANSWER + 9)
          PUT(TO, 20, ANSWER)
          COUNT + 1 => RA
     >>
     WHILE RA LT 10

     CLOSE(TO)
     STOP(0)
     END

//******************************************************************************

See also
 GEC 4000 series
 OS4000

References 

Articles with example code
Systems programming languages
Assemblers
Charles Babbage
GEC Computers